Duan Liuyu (born 24 July 1998) is a Chinese footballer currently playing as a midfielder for Shandong Taishan.

Early life
Duan Liuyu started to play football at the age of five and soon joined organised football classes setup by the Shenzhen Football Association before he was admitted to Cuiyuan Middle School as a football special student in 2010.In 2013, Duan was selected to participate in the China U-16 national team to play in the 2014 AFC U-16 Championship. After the tournament it was discovered that Duan required glasses and was in the honours class within school, he would soon receive the nick name "Glasses striker" by the Chinese media. Duan Liuyu would graduate from Cuiyuan High School in Luohu District, Shenzhen in 2015.

Club career
On 19 January 2015, Duan Liuyu joined Shandong Taishan as a youth player for a record transfer fee of 1 million RMB, at the time the highest ever paid to a Chinese youth player. Right after the contract signing, Duan Liuyu was sent to São Paulo FC youth training camp for a two year training program. On July 15, 2018, Shandong Taishan announced that they had promoted Duan Liuyu to the first team's roaster. On 1 March 2019 in the first league game for Shandong in the 2019 Chinese Super League season, Duan Liuyu would make his professional football debut against Beijing Renhe in a 1-0 victory.

After making his debut Duan Liuyu would immediately establish himself into the team and scored his first goal in the Chinese Super League in a 3–2 defeat against Henan Jianye on 12 July 2019. A consistent regular within the team, he would gain his first Chinese FA Cup by winning the 2020 Chinese FA Cup against Jiangsu Suning F.C. in a 2-0 victory. This would be followed by his first league title with the club when he was part of the team that won the 2021 Chinese Super League title. Another Chinese FA Cup would be followed up by him winning the 2022 Chinese FA Cup with them.

Career statistics

Honours

Club
Shandong Taishan
Chinese Super League: 2021.
Chinese FA Cup: 2020, 2021, 2022.

References

External links

1998 births
Living people
Chinese footballers
Chinese expatriate footballers
Association football midfielders
Chinese Super League players
Shandong Taishan F.C. players
São Paulo FC players
Chinese expatriate sportspeople in Brazil
Expatriate footballers in Brazil